The second season of Drag Race Italia premiered on 20 October 2022. The ten contestants were announced on 30 September 2022. The winner of the second season of Drag Race Italia was La Diamond, with Aura Eternal and Nehellenia as runners-up.

Discovery+ confirmed that the reality show opened a casting call for season two. On 29 September 2022, they showed a teaser confirming ten contestants with Italian drag performer Priscilla, actress Chiara Francini and television personality Tommaso Zorzi reconfirmed as judges.

The season consisted of eight one-hour episodes.

Contestants 

Ages, names, and cities stated are at time of filming.

Notes:

Contestant progress

Lip syncs
Legend:

Guest judges
Listed in chronological order:

Patty Pravo, singer
Ludovico Tersigni, actor and television host
Nancy Brilli, actress
Sandra Milo, actress and television personality
, choreographer, former dancer and television personality
Nick Cerioni, stylist
, dancer and television personality
Claudia Gerini, actress
Supremme de Luxe, Spanish drag queen and singer, host of Drag Race España
, actress and comedian
Paola Iezzi, singer, DJ and record producer
, actor and choreographer

Special guests
Guests who appeared in episodes, but did not judge on the main stage.

Episode 4
Ava Hangar, 5th place on season 1
Divinity, 6th place on season 1
Elecktra Bionic, winner of season 1
Farida Kant, runner-up on season 1
Ivana Vamp, 8th place on season 1
Le Riche, runner-up on season 1
Luquisha Lubamba, 4th place and Miss Congeniality of season 1

Episode 5
Andrea Attila Felice, choreographer

Episode 7
Michele Magani, MAC Cosmetics' global senior artist

Episode 8
Andrea Attila Felice, choreographer
Elecktra Bionic, winner of season 1
Luquisha Lubamba, 4th place and Miss Congeniality of season 1

Episodes 
<onlyinclude>

References 

2022 in LGBT history
2022 Italian television seasons
Drag Race Italia seasons